Amanda Oliveira de Lemos (born May 22, 1987) is a Brazilian mixed martial artist who competes in the Strawweight division of the Ultimate Fighting Championship.  As of November 8, 2022, she is #3 in the UFC women's strawweight rankings, and as of March 7, 2023, she is #10 in the UFC women's pound-for-pound rankings.

Mixed martial arts career

Early career
Lemos started her professional mixed martial arts career in her native Brazilian regional circuit, fighting mostly in Jungle Fight. Racking up an undefeated record of 5–0, she faced Mayra Cantuária for the Jungle Fight Women's Bantamweight Championship at Jungle Fight 85 on January 23, 2016. The fight ended in a majority draw, which prompted a rematch between the two contenders. The rematch for the title took place on June 25, 2016 at Jungle Fight 88. Lemos won the title via third-round knockout.

Lemos was scheduled to face Arlene Blencowe at Legend MMA 1 on January 28, 2017. However, Lemos withdrew from the bout and was replaced by Janay Harding.

Ultimate Fighting Championship
Replacing injured Lina Länsberg on short notice, Lemos made her promotional debut against Leslie Smith at UFC Fight Night: Nelson vs. Ponzinibbio on July 16, 2017. She lost the lopsided fight via second-round knockout.

On March 28, 2018, news surfaced that USADA had suspended Lemos for two years for testing positive for stanozolol and its metabolite, stemming from a sample taken on November 8, 2017.

Dropping to strawweight
Lemos was scheduled to return from the suspension against Veronica Macedo in a strawweight bout on December 21, 2019, at UFC Fight Night 165. However, Macedo withdrew from the bout due to concussion-like symptoms and was replaced by Miranda Granger. She won the fight via technical submission.

Lemos faced Mizuki Inoue at UFC on ESPN: Munhoz vs. Edgar on August 22, 2020. She won the fight via unanimous decision.

Lemos faced Lívia Renata Souza on March 6, 2021, at UFC 259. She won the fight via technical knockout in round one after knocking Souza down twice.

Lemos faced Montserrat Ruiz on July 17, 2021, at UFC on ESPN 26. Lemos won the fight via technical knockout in round one.

Lemos was scheduled to face Nina Nunes on December 18, 2021, at UFC Fight Night: Lewis vs. Daukaus. However, Nunes was removed from the bout for undisclosed reasons and was replaced by Angela Hill. Lemos won the bout via split decision. 10 out of 11 media scores gave it to Hill. This bout earned the Fight of the Night bonus award.

Lemos faced former strawweight champion Jéssica Andrade on April 23, 2022, at UFC Fight Night 205. She lost the fight via a standing arm-triangle choke in round one.

Lemos faced Michelle Waterson on July 16, 2022, at UFC on ABC 3. She won the fight via guillotine choke submission in the second round. This win earned Lemos her first Performance of the Night bonus award.

Lemos was scheduled to face Marina Rodriguez on October 22, 2022 at UFC 280, but the bout was postponed to UFC Fight Night 214 for unknown reasons. She won the fight via technical knockout in the third round.

Championships and accomplishments
Ultimate Fighting Championship
Fight of the Night (One time) 
 Performance of the Night (One time) 
 Tied (Jéssica Andrade & Rose Namajunas) for most finishes in UFC Women's Strawweight division history (five)
 Tied (with Jéssica Andrade) for most knockouts in UFC Women's Strawweight division history (three)
Jungle Fight
Jungle Fight Women's Bantamweight Champion (One time)
Two successful title defenses

Mixed martial arts record

|-
|Win
|align=center|13–2–1
|Marina Rodriguez
|TKO (punches)
|UFC Fight Night: Rodriguez vs. Lemos
|
|align=center|3
|align=center|0:54
|Las Vegas, Nevada, United States
|
|-
|Win
|align=center|12–2–1
|Michelle Waterson
|Submission (guillotine choke)
|UFC on ABC: Ortega vs. Rodríguez
|
|align=center|2
|align=center|1:48
|Elmont, New York, United States
|
|-
|Loss
|align=center|11–2–1
|Jéssica Andrade
|Submission (standing arm-triangle choke)	
|UFC Fight Night: Lemos vs. Andrade
|
|align=center|1
|align=center|3:13
|Las Vegas, Nevada, United States
|
|-
|Win
|align=center|11–1–1
|Angela Hill
|Decision (split)
|UFC Fight Night: Lewis vs. Daukaus
|
|align=center|3
|align=center|5:00
|Las Vegas, Nevada, United States
|
|-
|Win
|align=center| 
|Montserrat Ruiz
|TKO (punches)
|UFC on ESPN: Makhachev vs. Moisés 
|
|align=center|1
|align=center|0:35
|Las Vegas, Nevada, United States
|
|-
|Win
|align=center| 9–1–1
|Lívia Renata Souza
|TKO (punches)
|UFC 259 
|
|align=center|1
|align=center|3:39
|Las Vegas, Nevada, United States
|
|-
| Win
| align=center| 8–1–1
| Mizuki Inoue
||Decision (unanimous)
| UFC on ESPN: Munhoz vs. Edgar
| 
| align=center|3
| align=center|5:00
| Las Vegas, Nevada, United States
| 
|-
| Win
| align=center| 7–1–1
| Miranda Granger
| Technical Submission (rear-naked choke)
| UFC Fight Night: Edgar vs. The Korean Zombie
| 
| align=center| 1
| align=center| 3:43
| Busan, South Korea
| 
|-
| Loss
| align=center| 6–1–1
| Leslie Smith
| TKO (punches)
| UFC Fight Night: Nelson vs. Ponzinibbio
| 
| align=center| 2
| align=center| 2:53
| Glasgow, Scotland
| 
|-
| Win
| align=center| 6–0–1
| Mayra Cantuária
| KO (knee)
| Jungle Fight 88
| 
| align=center| 3
| align=center| 0:28
| Poços de Caldas, Brazil
| 
|-
| Draw
| align=center| 5–0–1
| Mayra Cantuária
| Draw (majority)
| Jungle Fight 85
| 
| align=center| 3
| align=center| 5:00
| São Paulo, Brazil
| 
|-
| Win
| align=center| 5–0
| Carol Cunha
| Submission (guillotine choke)
| Jungle Fight 82
| 
| align=center| 1
| align=center| 2:15
| São Paulo, Brazil
| 
|-
| Win
| align=center| 4–0
| Carol Abdon
| TKO (punches)
| Fusão de Artes Marciais 5
| 
| align=center| 1
| align=center| 3:20
| Soure, Brazil
| 
|-
| Win
| align=center| 3–0
| Débora Dias Nascimento
| TKO (punches)
| Jungle Fight 77
| 
| align=center| 1
| align=center| 3:23
| Foz do Iguaçu, Brazil
| 
|-
| Win
| align=center| 2–0
| Alenice Correa Costa
| TKO (punches)
| Jurunense Open Fight MMA 8
| 
| align=center| 1
| align=center| 4:15
| Belém, Brazil
| 
|-
| Win
| align=center| 1–0
| Laura Falcão
| TKO (punches)
| Fusão de Artes Marciais 3
| 
| align=center| 1
| align=center| 4:23
| Soure, Brazil
|

See also 
 List of current UFC fighters
 List of female mixed martial artists

References

External links 
  
 

1987 births
Living people
Sportspeople from Belém
Brazilian female mixed martial artists
Strawweight mixed martial artists
Ultimate Fighting Championship female fighters